Ronald Nunan Preston (born July 15, 1958) is an American former international motorcycle speedway rider who was the European Junior Champion in 1979. 



Motorcycle racing career
Born in Newport Beach, California, Preston began his racing career with the Poole Pirates in 1979 and spent two years there before moving to the Eastbourne Eagles in 1982. He was the first American to take part in the World Junior Championships and won silver medals with the USA team at the 1980 and 1981 Speedway World Team Cup. He retired from the sport at the end of the 1982 season due to a friend's death. Preston has two children.
Preston was slated to ride in the 1979 Speedway World Pairs Championship Final with Bruce Penhall at the Speedway Center in Vojens, Denmark after first Kelly Moran had to pull out due to injuries suffered in a practice crash and the Moran's replacement Steve Gresham failed to arrive. However, Preston was left stranded at the Heathrow Airport in London, England and could not make it to Denmark in time, which forced Penhall to ride the Pairs Final alone.

World Final appearances

World Team Cup
 1980 -  Wrocław, Olympic Stadium (with Bruce Penhall / Scott Autrey / Dennis Sigalos / Bobby Schwartz) – 2nd – 29pts (0)

References

1958 births
Living people
Sportspeople from Newport Beach, California
American speedway riders
Poole Pirates riders
Eastbourne Eagles riders